John H. Waterhouse was an American businessman and politician who served as the 7th Mayor of North Adams, Massachusetts.

Mayoral Elections

1908 Election 
Waterhouse was elected Mayor of North Adams in the election held on December 15, 1908.

1909 Election 
Waterhouse was reelected in December 1909.  In 1909 he defeated the Democratic party candidate, John H. Riley, by a majority of 262 votes. The vote totals were 1648 for Waterhouse, and 1386 for Riley.

Business career 
Waterhouse began his career in the wool industry working at a wool mill in Lawrence, Massachusetts. Waterhouse was, with Theodore Howard, a member of the manufacturing firm of Waterhouse and Howard which, in 1905 leased the Eagle Mill in North Adams and operated it as a wollen mill. Waterhouse was the operator of Blackinton Woolen Mill in North Adams from 1910 to its liquidation in 1939.

Notes 

Mayors of North Adams, Massachusetts
1948 deaths
American balloonists
Businesspeople from Massachusetts
People from North Adams, Massachusetts
Politicians from Lawrence, Massachusetts
1870 births
Massachusetts Republicans